Below is a list of awards, accolades and recognitions that singer Diana Ross has won throughout her long career in show business both as member of The Supremes and her solo career.

American Music Awards

The American Music Awards is an annual music awards ceremony and one of several major annual American music awards shows. Ross has won seven American Music Awards out of nine nominations.

|-
|1974
| Lady Sings the Blues
| Favorite Pop/Rock Album
| 
|-
|1975
|rowspan="3"|Diana Ross
|rowspan="3"|Favorite Soul/R&B Female Vocalist
|
|-
|1977
|
|-
|rowspan="2"|1981
|
|-
|Upside Down
|Favorite Soul/R&B Single
|
|-
|rowspan="2"|1982
|rowspan="2"|Endless Love
|Favorite Soul/R&B Single (Duet)
|
|-
|Favorite Pop/Rock Single (Duet)
|
|-
|1983
|rowspan="2"|Diana Ross
|rowspan="2"|Favorite Soul/R&B Female Vocalist
|
|-
|1986
|
|-

Cable Ace Awards

|-
| 1981
| Diana Ross
| General Entertainment (Music)
|

Grammy Awards

The Grammy Awards are awarded annually by the National Academy of Recording Arts and Sciences of the United States. Ross has received 13 nominations and was the recipient of the Grammy Lifetime Achievement Award in 2012 and 2023 (as a member of the Supremes).

|-
| 1965
| "Baby Love" 
| Best Rhythm & Blues Recording 
| 
|-
| 1966
| "Stop In The Name Of Love" 
| Best Contemporary Rock & Roll Group Vocal Performance 
| 
|-
| 1971
| "Ain't No Mountain High Enough"
| Best Female Contemporary Vocal Performance 
| 
|-
| 1972
| "Call Me"
| Best Female R&B Vocal Performance 
|  
|-
| 1974
| "Touch Me in the Morning"
| Best Pop Female Vocal Performance
| 
|-
| 1977
| "Love Hangover"
| Best R&B Female Vocal Performance
| 
|-
| 1978
| "Your Love is So Good For Me"
| Best R&B Female Vocal Performance
| 
|-
| 1979
| "Ease on Down the Road"
| Best R&B Vocal Performance by a Duo or Group 
| 
|-
| 1981
| "Upside Down"
| Best R&B Female Vocal Performance
| 
|-
| rowspan="2"|1982
| rowspan="2"|"Endless Love"  with Lionel Richie
| Best Pop Vocal Performance by a Duo or Group
| 
|-
| Record of the Year 
| 
|-
| 1983
|"Muscles"
| Best R&B Female Vocal Performance
| 
|-
| 2012
| Herself
|Lifetime Achievement Award 
|
|-
| rowspan="2"|2023
|Thank You
| Best Traditional Pop Vocal Album
| 
|-
| The Supremes
| Lifetime Achievement Award
| 
|-

People's Choice Award

The People's Choice Awards is an annual awards show recognizing the people and the work of popular culture .In 1980 Diana Ross received  one nomination and lost it to Barbara Mandrell.

|-
| 1980
| Diana Ross
| Favorite Pop Singer
|

TV Land Awards

|-
| 2006
| 1983 Concert in Central Park
| Most Memorable TV Performance
|

Film, television and internet

11 nominations and 5 wins in total.

Academy Awards

|-
| 1973
| Lady Sings the Blues
| Best Actress
|

BAFTA Film Awards

|-
| 1973
| Lady Sings the Blues 
| Best Actress
|

Golden Globe Awards

|-
| rowspan="2"|1973
| Diana Ross
| Most Promising Newcomer, Female
| 
|-
| Lady Sings The Blues
| Best Actress
| 
|-
| 1995
| Out of Darkness
| Best Performance by an Actress in a Mini-Series or Motion Picture Made for TV
|

New York Film Critics

|-
| 1973
| Lady Sings The Blues
| Best Actress
|

People's Choice Award

The People's Choice Awards is an annual awards show recognizing the people and the work of popular culture .In 1980 Diana Ross received  one nomination and lost it to Katharine Hepburn.

|-
| 1976
| Diana Ross
| Favorite Motion Picture Actress
| 
|-

Saturn Awards

|-
| 1978
| The Wiz
| Best Actress
| 
|-

Tony Awards

|-
| 1977
| An Evening With Diana Ross
| Special Tony Award
| 
|-

Cue Magazine

|-
| 1973
| Diana Ross
| Entertainer of the Year
|

Inductions

1970

NAACP Image Awards

|-
| 1970
| Diana Ross
| Female Entertainer of the Year
|

1976

Billboard Award

|-
| 1976
| Diana Ross
| Female Entertainer of the Century
|

1982

Hollywood Walk of Fame - Solo star located at 6712 Hollywood Blvd, Hollywood, CA.

|-
| 1982
| Diana Ross
| Hollywood Walk of Fame
|

1988

Rock & Roll Hall of Fame

|-
| 1988
| The Supremes
| Performer  - as a member
|

1993

Guinness Book of World Records

|-
| 1993
| Diana Ross
| Most Successful Female Singer of All Time
|

1994

Hollywood Walk of Fame - Star with the Supremes located at 7060 Hollywood Blvd, Hollywood, CA

|-
| 2015
| The Supremes
| Hollywood Walk of Fame
| 

MIDEM (World Music Market)

|-
| 1994
| Diana Ross
| Lifetime Achievement Award
| 

Commander of the Order of Arts and Letters (Commandeur de l'ordre des Arts et des Lettres) France's recognition of significant contributions to the arts.

|-
| 1994
| Diana Ross
| 
|

1995

Soul Train Music Awards

|-
| 1995
| Diana Ross
| Heritage Award
|

1996

Billboard magazine

|-
| 1996
| Diana Ross
| Female Entertainer of the Century
| 

Soul Train Hall of Fame

|-
| 1996
| Diana Ross
| Induction - Soul Train Hall of Fame
| 

World Music Awards 

|-
| 1996
|Diana Ross
| Lifetime Achievement Award

1998

Songwriter's Hall of Fame

|-
| 1998
| Diana Ross
| The Hitmaker Award
|

1999

BET Walk of Fame

|-
| 1999
| Diana Ross
| Star.2000
| 

National Academy of Recording Arts and Sciences (NARAS)

|-
| 1999
| Diana Ross
| Heroes Award
|

2003

UK Capital Awards

|-
| 2003
| Diana Ross
| Legendary Female Artist
| 

National Association of Black Owned Broadcasters

|-
| 2003
| Diana Ross
| Lifetime Achievement Award
|

2007

BET Music Awards

|-
| 2007
| Diana Ross
| Lifetime Achievement Award
| 

Kennedy Center Honors - John F. Kennedy Center for the Performing Arts for her contribution to entertainment

2012

Grammy Awards

|-
| 2012
| Diana Ross
| Lifetime Achievement Award - as a solo artist
|

2014

Golden Plate Award of the American Academy of Achievement presented by Awards Council members George Lucas and Mayor Willie Brown in San Francisco.

2016

Presidential Medal of Freedom

2017

American Music Awards

|-
| 2017
| Diana Ross
| Lifetime Achievement Award
|

2023

Grammy Awards

|-
| 2023
| The Supremes
| Lifetime Achievement Award - as a member
|

See also
Diana Ross, the main article

References

Awards
Ross Diana